The 1972 Lehigh Engineers football team was an American football team that represented Lehigh University as an independent during the 1972 NCAA College Division football season.

In their eighth year under head coach Fred Dunlap, the Engineers compiled a 5–6 record. Tom Benfield and Brian Derwin were the team captains.

After a decisive victory over Hofstra to start the season, the Engineers briefly appeared in the national NCAA College Division coaches poll, ranking No. 12. A loss to No. 1 Delaware in their second matchup dropped them to No. 20, and a loss the next week to Rutgers pushed Lehigh out of the top 20 altogether. Lehigh remained unranked the rest of the year.

Lehigh played its home games at Taylor Stadium on the university campus in Bethlehem, Pennsylvania.

Schedule

References

Lehigh
Lehigh Mountain Hawks football seasons
Lehigh Engineers football